A tidal farm is a group of multiple tidal stream generators assembled in the same location used for production of electric power, similar to that of a wind farm. The low-voltage powerlines from the individual units are then connected to a substation, where the voltage is stepped up with the use of a transformer for distribution through a high voltage transmission system.

Research and development 
A mathematical optimization approach is used design turbine farm layouts. Using the environmental parameters such as water depth and incorporating them using mathematical formulas, a farm layout can be developed and tested. Through this research and development, factors such as the number of turbines, location of turbines and overall farm profit could be accurately tested and predicted.

In Brittany, France, a French tidal farm has deployed its first of two 500 KW turbines. The Project is located 16 miles offshore and has a depth of 35 meters. Once the power is generated it will be converted and transported to an onshore site located in the Arcouest Peninsula in Ploubazlanec. This project contributes towards the progress in a shifts towards renewable energy and tidal energy in particular.

In Iran there have been interest in development of tidal stream energy due to its predictability, and consistency. Faculty of Civil Engineering at the university of Tarbiat Modares University have identified potential sites of interest of these farms. Locations include the Persian Gulf, the Oman Sea, Khowran Straight, Hengam Island and Greater Tunb Island. Cost of energy, power output, Tariff rates and expected return on investments have also been factors analyzed and studied by the university research group.

Methods have been developed in order to determine the most suitable sites for tidal farms. Factors considered in the selection of locations include potential to provide the greatest power performance, the least amount of cost, and the least amount of inconvenience towards marine life. A case study done in the Bristol Channel used a hydrodynamic model on a Matlab-based program in order to obtain its results.

Technology
 
Tidal Farms utilize tidal stream generators that are grouped together to produce electricity. These generators use the moving tides to turn turbines that are very similar the wind turbines used on land. The power of the ocean and the turbines advance technology guarantee a much more predictable energy output then regular wind turbines. The turbines are usually located in areas with high tidal activity in order for the generators to be as efficient as possible. What makes tidal farms unique is that they are set up in groups to allow much more energy production. The generators are connected to substations on shore to transform voltage from high to low, or low to high. These generators can be semi-submersible or fixed into the sea floor, which means they would be out of sight and not an eyesore for the public. The turbines that would be used would be very slow moving due to the density of the water, this is very beneficial to the aquatic life because fish would be able to freely pass through without being in danger of dying. Some turbines can also be used in irrigation canals, rivers, and dam whether the flow of water is fast or slow.

Operators 
Scotland is one of the main leaders in the effort to utilize tidal energy as an alternative energy resource. In 2012, Scottish Power installed a 30 ft. turbine off of the Orkney Islands. The currents off of these islands are very fast moving and the tests conducted had shown that the generator produced one megawatt of electricity, enough to power 500 homes. Scotland is also looking to install a more powerful generator off of the Sound of Islay that would be capable of powering in upwards of 5,000 homes once fully operational. In January 2015, production of a 400-megawatt tidal generator was being constructed in Northern Scotland. This generator would be capable of powering 175,000 homes. Ocean power is a clean and efficiency with an energy source that never turns off. Using Tidal farms is a much cleaner and efficient way to produce electricity. One of the drawbacks to tidal farms is marine life and how it will affect it. They would also need to set the tidal farms deep in the ocean where it won't affect fishing boats or large ship passing by. The United States of America has nearly 12,380 miles of coastline, and is currently offering up to $22 million in funding for research into marine power sources.

Leaders in Practice 
The company Ocean Flow used Siemens technology to design a semi-submersible turbine. The models created have proven to be able to withstand sea conditions excellently. The company claims its model creates less disturbances to its surrounding ecosystem, and cost less to deploy. A key feature to this model set up is the platform that the turbine rest on. It was developed at Newcastle University School of Marine Science and Technology in 2006. The Platform is suitable to withstand harsh conditions in deep depth of the ocean. Senior development engineer at OceanFlow Mark Knos commented on the project and stated that they had created a 1/40th scale model to test and a 1/10 scale model as well. Both models were tested and have provided promising results.

Tidal Farm Generation in North America 
North America has fewer tidal power stations than any other comparable geographical area, in terms of GDP or population. Tidal power has been estimated to be able to account for fifteen percent of the United States’ power consumption if harnessed correctly. The first tidal instillation in North America to connect to a power grid was laid down in 2012, in Cobscook Bay, Maine by the Ocean Renewable Power Company. The preliminary device generates 180 Kilowatts at full capacity. Plans to install two more devices were shelved as of 2013. Tidal generators were installed in 2009 by OpenHydro and Emera the Bay of Fundy. These tidal generators suffered damage, losing several blades in the process, due to the powerful tides in the Bay. In the autumn of 2016 a joint venture by the same two companies successfully placed a 2-Megawatt tidal generator in the Bay of Fundy, of which Cobscook Bay is a constituent area. The successful integration of the new tidal generators to local power stations, and the connected power grid supplies an estimated 150 to 200 homes per day.

Types 
•	Double and Three Bladed Turbine are turbines attached to a stationary pole and rotate axial to chase the ocean currents. Some of the double and triple bladed turbines can have two sets attached to the pole for better efficiency. This type of turbine has to be detached from the stationary pole and lifter with cranes attached to ships when maintenance is to be performed.  
 
•	Semi Submersible Turbines is a more expensive turbine but in the long run it is cheaper and is more cost efficient. The turbines are connecting to a stationary post and the turbine generator can be raised and lowered anytime for maintenance.

•	Duct Style Turbine uses duct all the way around the entrance of the turbine to guide and accelerate the tidal stream toward the rotor. By using a duct, more energy can be extracted from the same amount of water with smaller diameter rotor blades thereby keeping costs of manufacture and maintenance down.

•	Cable Tethered Turbine floating turbines are attached by a chain to a stationary point in the bottom of the ocean and follow the ocean current in a horizontal 360 degrees. These turbines are easy to bring up to the surface for maintenance because they are pressurized with air. They are also equipped with sensors to detect any water trying to make its way into the pressurized generator.

Problems
One of the few environmental unknowns about tidal farms is the threat they may pose to the plant life in the areas that the turbines would be set up.  But by having the blades turn at a slower than normal speed wind turbines can eliminate some of the potential environmental problems. Another problem that can occur is making the turbines water tight to prevent seawater from corrosion the metal parts inside the turbine. Underwater turbines would have to be position away from shipping lanes, too close to shore, and in deep enough waters for them not to interfere with everyday shipping traffic. Having countries like Scotland position underwater turbines can help other countries learn and explore better ideas for creating energy by learning from the successes and the failures achieved by the leading countries. Scotland expects the rest of the world to follow their example and install tidal farms all over the world in the efforts to help stop pollution and make producing energy cleaner and safer.

Effects on ocean geography and tidal patterns 

Tidal farms present many possible environmental and ecological changes to the environment they are placed in. The structures of these farms produce changes in tidal patterns, sediment flow, and water column turbulence. Tidal patterns can be affected in different ways depending on the structure of the farm itself. The structure is referring to the size and cross-sectional area because the number of blades or the load that is put on the farm doesn't make much of a difference on the overall height of the water. These effects can be seen to lower both the high tide and low tides which means that the water level will be lower in total. The number of blades and load on the system however does affect the tidal range vastly. Tidal range can be reduced up to 42% with observations of the densest farms which can cause destruction to 32% of the areas around them, but it can be controlled. Damage can be reduced to 19% by using a two-rotor spaced turbine and only 5.4% with five-rotor spaced turbines. This is done by spreading the water's work over a large surface area on the turbine itself to mitigate the alteration of the flow in the water column.

Sediment flow is affected by the introduction of tidal farms to an area. Not only does it create turbulence that moves the sediment, but it changes the ecosystem around it. By moving more sediment into areas that didn't gain much before, places like grass beds could be wiped out by being covered in sediment. The geography on the ocean floor would be changed by the new sediment flow patterns because of the new turbulence. New things like sandbars could form around the farms causing even more of an impact to the surrounding environment by influencing more changes than originally expected.

The water column also faces multiple chances since the force it transfers through turbulence is being absorbed by the tidal farms. Waves would be directly affected by the reduced energy behind the water causing them to be weaker which too could destroy multiple ecosystems. There would also be an effect on the inter-tidal zones with there being less turbulence which many species like fish and crabs use for sustenance and survival. Other things like noise and electromagnetic fields also pose problems for the environment, but not to the scale that the last effects had on the geography and life in an ecosystem.

Effects on ecology 

The prime placement of tidal farms occurs in tidal barrages, marshes, lagoons and other intertidal bodies of waters most commonly home to migratory wetland birds. The placement of tidal farms raises the water levels to a point where the feeding areas of the birds are submerged. With the loss of feeding areas, mortality rates increase. Furthermore, studies were conducted by University of Exeter faculty for wetland birds in the Solway Firth, UK. These studies concluded that the effect of certain types of tidal farms are negligible. The impacts of tidal farms on water foul habitats in the Solway Firth were found to be relatively low, even for the largest case. The study highlighted that current installations with similar capacities as the simulations had a lower loss of intertidal area than that of its computer-generated counterpart . One conclusion reached was that future studies should focus on the vulnerability of an individual species, as compared to the effect on maritime birds as a whole.

The construction of tidal barrages within a bay, inlet, or estuary is one of the few cases where inter species relations were universally affected. The retention of tidal water alters the timetable of species which dominate the upper to intermediate shore habitats. Simultaneously the lower shore remains submerged for longer periods of time. The resulting forced ecosystem is disruptive to the majority of species present, with the exception of fish whom are tidal feeders. The extended periods of high tide allow for greater foraging opportunity, hence a growth in population can be observed in these cases.

The structures of larger tidal barrages alter the scour and deposition in their respective habitats. Scour and deposition refers to the movement and exchange of sediment along the floor of a water body. The U.S. Army Engineer Research and Development Center in Vicksburg, Mississippi stated that the interruption of natural sediment deposits directly led to an increased mortality rate of seabed grass, as the shoot could not properly grow in the altered seafloor. This would be even more devastating for benthic life which resides under the ocean floor since they are easily affected by changes in the flow over the bottom of the ocean. It would be hard to prevent this too since these organisms aren’t easily relocated since they are so sensitive to changes in their atmosphere.

See also 
 List of tidal power stations
 Tidal power
 Wave farm
 Wind Farm
 Dam
 Tide

References